Erayamangalam is a small village located in Namakkal district (Tamil Nadu / India) on the bank of the Kaveri River.

External links
A.Erayamangalam Voters List
In online view Tamil Fonts from
link as choose the district and Constituency

Villages in Namakkal district